The American Congress on Surveying and Mapping (ACSM) was an American professional association representing the interests of those engaged in measuring and communicating geospatial data.

Originally, it was composed of four organizations:
 American Association for Geodetic Surveying (AAGS)
 National Society of Professional Surveyors (NSPS)
 Cartographic and Geographic Information Society (CaGIS)
 Geographic and Land Information Society (GLIS)
During the 2000s, CaGIS and GLIS removed themselves from ACSM; in 2012, ACSM legally merged into the NSPS, while AAGS remained separate.

It published the bimonthly ACSM Bulletin, no longer in publication.
ACSM also published the quarterly Surveying and Land Information Science (SaLIS) technical journal, now officially published by the AAGS.

See also
American Society for Photogrammetry and Remote Sensing
ALTA Survey
Canadian Institute of Geomatics
International Federation of Surveyors

References

External links
 Official website
 The American Association for Geodetic Surveying Official website
 The National Society of Professional Surveyors, Inc. Official website

Professional associations based in the United States
Surveying organizations
Geographic data and information organizations in the United States